Vinil Poojary (born 27 August 1997) is an Indian professional footballer who plays as a winger for Jamshedpur B.

Career
Poojary made his professional debut for the Churchill Brothers against Punjab F.C. on 28 October 2018, He was brought in the 52nd minute as Churchill Brothers drew 0–0.

Jamshedpur B
In August 2022, Poojary signed for Jamshedpur B from Churchill Brothers.

Career statistics

Club

References

1997 births
Living people
Sportspeople from Mangalore
Churchill Brothers FC Goa players
Footballers from Karnataka
I-League players
Association football midfielders
Indian footballers
I-League 2nd Division players
Ozone FC players